Marafetu Togakilo Smith (born ) is a weaver and community activist from Niue. She founded the first Niuean weaving group in Auckland, and her work is held in the collections of Auckland War Memorial Museum and Te Papa.

Career 
In 1984, Smith founded the first Niuean weaving group in Auckland, called Tufuga Mataponiu a Niue. She eventually ran several groups for women from separate villages in Niue. Her sister Eseta Patii was also a weaver. Smith is also a dancer and choreographer, working with women's groups. She is also a former co-ordinator of the Niue Village at the Pasifika Festival. In 2000, she attended the Pacific Arts Festival in Noumea. In 2007, Smith accompanied Anand Satyanand to Niue, where a symposium of Niuean weaving was held. In 2009, she was appointed to Creative New Zealand's Pacific Arts Committee, alongside Frances Hartnell.

Legacy 
Auckland War Memorial Museum has one of Smith's designs in its collection. Two woven pieces by her are in the Te Papa collection: a basket called a Kato Fuakina and an 'ei (headpiece). Works created by weaving groups that Smith facilitated are held in the collection of the University of Auckland.

Awards 
 Creative New Zealand Senior Pacific Artist Award

References

External links 
 Tukituki e fua tuitui

Living people
1920s births
Niuean women
Weavers
Community activists
Niuean artists
Textile artists